Meleana Lokahi "Mana" Shim (born September 25, 1991) is an American former soccer player and current athlete advocate. Shim played as a midfielder, spending most of her senior career with Portland Thorns FC of the National Women's Soccer League (NWSL). After the revelations of the Yates Report, Shim was named chairperson of a new Participant Safety Taskforce at U.S. Soccer.

Early life
Shim grew up in Honolulu, Hawaii, where she attended Kamehameha Kapalama High School and helped the soccer team to three ILH championships. In 2007, the team won the state championship.

Shim also played for the club soccer team, Ho'okalakupua. In 2003 and 2005, the team was Region IV Finalists. In 2004, 2006, and 2007, the team was Region IV semi-finalists. In 2008, they won gold at the Surf Cup U19 Championship.

Santa Clara Broncos
Shim attended Santa Clara University from 2009 to 2012 where she was a three-year starting midfielder for the Broncos. As a freshman in 2009, she played in 20 of the squad's 23 matches. She finished the year with 21 shots, including seven during the Broncos' three NCAA Tournament matches. During her second year, Shim played in all 22 games, one of only four Broncos to do so, starting 18 matches for a total of 1,660 minutes played. She scored one goal and added three assists and was named an All-West Coast Conference honorable mention. As a junior in 2011, she started all 21 games and tallied four goals and four assists. She was named to the All-WCC Second-Team.

Playing career

Portland Thorns
Shim signed with the Portland Thorns as a discovery player for the inaugural season of the National Women's Soccer League. She made her debut for the team during a match against the Washington Spirit on May 4, 2013. She scored her first professional goal on June 16, 2013 at Jeld-Wen Field in a match against Seattle Reign FC. After receiving a through ball from teammate Angie Kerr near the penalty spot, Shim finished with a left-footed shot past the goalkeeper. She also served her first assist during the match after stealing the ball off a bad pass and passing it to forward Danielle Foxhoven, who was making a run into the left side of the penalty box. She was the Thorns' lone scorer in a 1–1 draw with the Western New York Flash on July 14, 2013 which began a scoring streak in which she scored a goal in four consecutive matches. In 2015, Shim went on loan to Japanese football team Iga Kunoichi FC but did not appear in a domestic match.

On January 10, 2014, it was announced that Shim was drafted by the Houston Dash with the fourth pick in the 2014 NWSL Expansion Draft. She was traded back to the Thorns one week later during the 2014 NWSL College Draft.

Växjö DFF
In 2017, Shim signed with Swedish side Växjö DFF of the Elitettan. She appeared in two matches as Växjö earned promotion to the 2018 Damallsvenskan.

Houston Dash
Shim returned to the NWSL in 2018, signing with the Dash.

Personal life
Shim self-identifies as Kanaka Maoli.

Shim publicly came out as a lesbian on August 30, 2013 in an interview with Outsports, the day before the Portland Thorns FC entered the National Women's Soccer League Championship.

In 2017, as part of an effort to lower the stigma of mental health issues among athletes, Shim revealed she had been diagnosed with bipolar disorder.

Activism
In 2021 Shim publicly accused her former manager Paul Riley of sexual misconduct and abuse to The Athletic in a story that resulted in Riley being fired from his then-current position with the North Carolina Courage, and the NWSL to seek further investigations. She is now enrolled in law school in Hawaii. Her anti-harassment advocacy led to her being named one of the 2022 "Law Students of the Year" by National Jurist.

On October 31, 2022, following the revelations of the Yates Report, Shim announced she was joining U.S. Soccer as the chair of a new Participant Safety Taskforce.

References

External links
Santa Clara University player profile

1991 births
Living people
American women's soccer players
Santa Clara Broncos women's soccer players
National Women's Soccer League players
Portland Thorns FC players
Soccer players from Honolulu
LGBT association football players
American LGBT sportspeople
LGBT people from Hawaii
Kamehameha Schools alumni
Women's association football midfielders
Houston Dash players
Lesbian sportswomen
Växjö DFF players
Expatriate women's footballers in Sweden
American expatriate women's soccer players
American expatriate sportspeople in Sweden
People with bipolar disorder